Anyadike  is an Igbo surname. Notable people with the surname include:

Erica Sugo Anyadike, Tanzanian writer 
Kimberly Anyadike (born 1994), American pilot
Unoaku Anyadike (born 1994), Nigerian model and beauty pageant titleholder

Igbo-language surnames